is a Japanese male  track cyclist, riding for the national team. He competed at the 2010 and 2011 UCI Track Cycling World Championships. He is also a professional keirin cyclist.

References

External links
 Profile at cyclingarchives.com

1984 births
Living people
Japanese male cyclists
Place of birth missing (living people)
Cyclists at the 2010 Asian Games
Keirin cyclists
Asian Games competitors for Japan
21st-century Japanese people